Debora Magnaghi (born 17 June 1970) is an Italian voice actress from Milan. She mainly works in the field of animated cartoons.

She made her voice acting debut in the 1980s, lending her voice to the titular protagonist of the anime Little Memole. She became famous in the early 1990s as the lead in Ciao Ciao, starring alongside fellow voice actor Davide Garbolino. Since then, she has dubbed over a number of characters, including Barbara Gordon/Batgirl in Batman: The Animated Series, Ran Mōri in Case Closed, Android 18 in Dragon Ball Z and Dragon Ball GT, Ichigo Momomiya in Tokyo Mew Mew, Ami Mizuno/Sailor Mercury in the entire Sailor Moon series, and most recently Sara in Mermaid Melody Pichi Pichi Pitch. Since 2009, she has played Roxy in the animated fantasy series Winx Club and its spin-off World of Winx.

External links
 
 

1970 births
Italian voice actresses
Living people
Actresses from Milan